Laurien Vermulst (born 14 June 1960 in 's-Hertogenbosch) is a Dutch rower. She finished 4th in the women's quadruple sculls at the 1992 Summer Olympics.

References 
 
 

1960 births
Living people
Dutch female rowers
Sportspeople from 's-Hertogenbosch
Olympic rowers of the Netherlands
Rowers at the 1992 Summer Olympics
Rowers at the 1996 Summer Olympics
World Rowing Championships medalists for the Netherlands
21st-century Dutch women
20th-century Dutch women